Ronald Hans Anton Plasterk (born 12 April 1957) is a Dutch scientist, entrepreneur and retired politician of the Labour Party (PvdA). He has earned a PhD degree in biology, specialised in molecular genetics. Being a former Minister of the Dutch government, he has been the founder and CEO of Frame Cancer Therapeutics since December 2018. Next to his work at Frame, he has been appointed as professor at the University of Amsterdam since September 2018.

Biography

Plasterk attended a Gymnasium in The Hague from 1969 till 1975. He then went to the Leiden University, where he obtained his MSc degree cum laude in biology in 1981. From 1980, Plasterk also studied economics at the University of Amsterdam, of which he completed the propaedeutics in 1981. From 1981 to 1984 he worked as a researcher at the biomedical institute of the Leiden University before earning his PhD degree in natural science in 1984. Beside this, Plasterk also served on the Municipal Council of Leiden from 11 October 1982 until 1 September 1984.

Plasterk worked as a postdoctoral researcher at the California Institute of Technology in Pasadena, California from January 1985 until November 1987. Afterwards, he worked at the Laboratory of Molecular Biology in Cambridge, England where he conducted research on Caenorhabditis elegans, a nematode used as a model organism. In Cambridge he worked together with British later Nobel laureate John Sulston. 

Plasterk worked as a researcher at Netherlands Cancer Institute from November 1987 until February 2000 and served as director of the Oncology department of the Netherlands Cancer Institute from July 1989 until February 2000. Plasterk worked as a professor of molecular biology at the Free University Amsterdam from January 1993 until February 1997 and as a professor of molecular genetics at the University of Amsterdam from February 1997 until February 2000.

Plasterk worked as director of the Hubrecht Institute an affiliation of the Royal Academy of Arts and Sciences from February 2000 until February 2007 and was a professor of molecular genetics at the Utrecht University from February 2000 until February 2007.

He became active in the public sector and occupied numerous seats as a nonprofit director on several boards of directors and supervisory boards (Wellcome Trust, European Molecular Biology Organization, European Centre for Nature Conservation and the Royal Academy of Arts and Sciences) served on several state commissions and councils on behalf of the government (Health Council) and as a political pundit and columnist for Intermediair, Volkskrant and Buitenhof.

After the election of 2006, Plasterk was appointed as Minister of Education, Culture and Science in the Cabinet Balkenende IV, taking office on 22 February 2007.

The Cabinet Balkenende IV fell on 20 February 2010 after tensions in the coalition over the extension of the Dutch involvement in the Task Force Urozgan of the International Security Assistance Force (ISAF) in Afghanistan and continued to serve in a demissionary capacity until the Labour Party cabinets members resigned on 23 February 2010. Plasterk was elected as a Member of the House of Representatives after the election of 2010, taking office on 17 June 2010 serving as a frontbencher and spokesperson for Finances.

After the Leader of the Labour Party and Parliamentary leader of the Labour Party in the House of Representatives Job Cohen announced that he was stepping down as Leader and Parliamentary leader in the House of Representatives following increasing criticism on his leadership, Plasterk announced his candidacy to succeed him. Plasterk lost the leadership election to fellow frontbencher Diederik Samsom on 16 March 2012.

Following the election of 2012 Plasterk was appointed as Minister of the Interior and Kingdom Relations in the Cabinet Rutte II, taking office on 5 November 2012. Plasterk took a medical leave of absence from 29 June 2016 until 16 September 2016 during which Minister for Housing and the Central Government Sector Stef Blok served as acting Minister of the Interior and Kingdom Relations. On 10 September 2016, Plasterk announced his retirement from national politics and that he wouldn't stand for the election of 2017. The Cabinet Rutte II was replaced by the Cabinet Rutte III following the cabinet formation of 2017 on 26 October 2017.

Plasterk retired from national politics and became active in the private sector and public sector. Following his position as minister, Plasterk joined the company myTomorrows as chief scientific officer in December 2017. He left myTomorrows in December 2018 and founded the startup company Frame Cancer Therapeutics. of which he is also the CEO. Frame Cancer Therapeutics is a pharmaceutical company that is dedicated to the development of novel cancer immunotherapies. Besides this, Plasterk has also been appointed as professor at the University of Amsterdam in September 2018. Plasterk is also a prolific author, having written more than a dozen books and articles since 1990 about molecular biology, molecular genetics, education and atheism.

Career

Education and science
Plasterk attended highschool at the gymnasium (school) Sint Janscollege in The Hague between 1969 and 1975. He then studied biology at the Leiden University and economics at the University of Amsterdam. During this period he wrote for the student newspaper. In 1981, he obtained an MSc degree Cum Laude in biology. He obtained his propaedeutic diploma in economics in the same year. In 1984, he was awarded a PhD degree in mathematics and the natural sciences at Leiden University for his thesis "Inversion of the G segment of bacteriophage Mu: analysis of a genetic switch". His study focused on transposon sequences in DNA. While being a doctoral researcher between 1981 and 1984, Plasterk also was a member of the Leiden city council for the Labour Party.

Between 1985 and 1986, he worked as a postdoctoral researcher at the California Institute of Technology in Pasadena. There he studied the transposon sequences in DNA in the parasite Borrelia hermsii. Between 1986 and 1987 he was a post-doc at the MRC Laboratory of Molecular Biology in Cambridge,  where he worked with John Sulston. He studied Caenorhabditis elegans, a nematode that is used as a model organism.

In 1987 he returned to the Netherlands where he became group leader and member of the board of the Netherlands Cancer Institute in Amsterdam. In 1989 he became director of the research school of oncology at the institute, where he remained until 2000. Between 1993 and 1997 he occupied the endowed chair in molecular microbiology at the Vrije Universiteit Amsterdam. Between 1997 and 2000 he was professor of molecular genetics at the University of Amsterdam. In February 2000 he became director of the Netherlands Institute for Developmental Biology, also known as the Hubrecht Laboratory, an institute of the Royal Netherlands Academy of Arts and Sciences (KNAW). He combined this with a position as professor in developmental genetics at Utrecht University from May 2000. He retained these positions until February 2007.

Since 2001 Plasterk has been a member of the Royal Netherlands Academy of Arts and Sciences. Before entering politics he also was a member of the Health Council, which advises the Minister of Health, Welfare and Sport, a member of the board of the Wellcome Trust, member of the Committee on Biotechnology and Animals and of the European Molecular Biology Organization.

Plasterk's research was in the area of genetics and functional genomics. He focused on the mechanism and regulation of DNA transposition, and on the mechanisms of RNA interference and microRNAs, including the functions of RNAi as a natural defense against the uncontrolled duplication of transposons.

Columnist
Plasterk started as a columnist in the Intermediair, a weekly magazine oriented at young professionals and academics, in 1995. In the early years he mainly wrote on the political and ethical aspects of genetic research. In 1999 he switched from his column in the Intermediair to a weekly column in de Volkskrant, a leading centre left quality newspaper and a two-weekly spoken column in Buitenhof, a political talkshow produced by the VPRO, the NPS and the VARA. He continued these columns until 2007 when he became minister. In 2000 several of his columns were bundled in the book Leven uit het Lab ("Life from the Lab")

Plasterk wrote on a wide range of subjects: he is an outspoken atheist. In 1997 he coined the term ietsisme ("somethingism") to refer to the religious belief that the Christian God does not exist, but that there is some greater force that created the universe and governs it.  This position is roughly equivalent to 18th century Deism. He first strongly criticized the belief on intellectual grounds, calling it a "poor and irritating phenomenon", but later claimed that it was a mix of atheism and nostalgia, and much more sympathetic "than the idea of a cruel God that wants this misery"

In his columns in de Volkskrant and Buitenhof, he also fiercely opposed the proposal of Maria van der Hoeven, who preceded him as minister of Education, to teach intelligent design in high schools.

Furthermore, in the referendum on the European constitution, he positioned himself as an outspoken critic of the Treaty establishing a Constitution for Europe. He opposed the constitution because he considered that it did not clearly codify the responsibilities of the European Union. He also felt that it laid too much emphasis on the free market.

Politics
Plasterk was a member of the Leiden city council for the Labour Party in the early 1980s. Since 1995 he has been a political columnist for several national publications and a commentator on TV. In the mid-2000s he assumed several more active posts in national politics.

In 2006 he was member of the committee which wrote the election manifesto for the Labour Party in the 2006 elections, which was led by Paul Depla. He also served as an advisor of the national convention, a think tank of the Dutch government on government reform.

On 22 February 2007 he was appointed minister of Education, Culture and Science in the fourth Balkenende cabinet for the Labour Party. Because of this appointment Plasterk has ended his scientific career, because he considers it is impossible to leave research for several years and then hope to reintegrate. Wouter Bos, leader of the Labour Party, sees Plasterk as a social and cultural libertarian, who balances out the social and cultural conservativism of the Labour Party's coalition partners Christian Democratic Appeal and the Christian Union.

As minister Plasterk was responsible for higher education and scientific education, for research, culture and media, women's emancipation and of the LBGT, and for policy on the unemployed in the education sector. As such he is vice chair of the national Innovation Platform and member of the task force Women on Top.

A key issue during Plasterk's period as minister was the salary of teachers. When there was no room in the national budget to increase the salaries of teachers as advised by a committee led by Alexander Rinnooy Kan, Plasterk was forced to find money from within the budget of his own ministry. Kan made his advice public just days after the Miljoenennota (the national budget) was published. One of the solutions Plasterk considered was cutting the allowance for students and raising the fees for universities. Plasterk was strongly criticized by the students unions for his proposals and by his coalition partners CDA and CU and the leftwing opposition parties SP and GroenLinks. In the end he and Wouter Bos, the minister of Finance, were able to find sufficient money for a marked increase in the salaries of teachers. Under the pressure of strikes by teachers, Plasterk came to a deal with the teachers´ union in April 2008.

He resigned on the morning of 20 February 2010, when all PvdA ministers withdrew from the fourth Balkenende cabinet. The Queen accepted the resignations on 23 February 2010. In the House of Representatives he focused on matters of finance.

After politics 
Following his position as minister, on December 1, 2017 Plasterk joined myTomorrows as Chief Scientific Officer, a company that mediates between patients, doctors, governments and pharmaceutical companies on faster availability of new medications. He left myTomorrows in December 2018 and founded the startup company Frame Cancer Therapeutics of which he is also the CEO. Frame Cancer Therapeutics is a pharmaceutical company that is dedicated to the development of novel cancer immunotherapies. Since September 2018, Plasterk has been appointed as a professor at the University of Amsterdam.

Personal life
Plasterk is married and has two children. He lives in Amsterdam. Plasterk is a member of the Royal Christian Oratory Association "Excelsior" in Amsterdam, an evangelical choir in which he sings as a tenor. He participates in the yearly recital of the Mattheus Passion of Johann Sebastian Bach of Excelsior. His other hobbies include literature, painting and photography.

In the summer of 2008 he appeared in Zomergasten, an evening long in-depth television interview of the VPRO.

Awards
 1999: Spinoza Prize of the Netherlands Organisation for Scientific Research
 2002: Award for Communication in the Life Sciences of European Molecular Biology Organization
 2005: Grand Prix scientifique de la Fondation Louis D. of the Institut de France (shared with American molecular biologist David P. Bartel)

Bibliography

Selected scientific publications
 Ketting, R.F., Fischer, S.E.J., Bernstein, E., Sijen, T., Hannon, G.J., Plasterk R.H.A. (2001). Dicer functions in RNA interference and in synthesis of small RNA involved in developmental timing in C. elegans. Genes & Development 15: 2654–2659.
 Sijen, T., Fleenor, J., Simmer, F., Thijssen, K.L., Parrish, S., Timmons, L., Plasterk, R.H.A., Fire, A. (2001). On the role of RNA amplification in dsRNA-triggered gene silencing. Cell 107: 465–476.
 Tijsterman, M., Ketting, R.F., Okihara, K. L., Sijen, T., Plasterk, R. H. A. (2002) Short antisense RNAs can trigger gene silencing in C. elegans, depending on the RNA helicase MUT-14. Science 25;295 (5555): 694–697
 Wienholds, E., Schulte-Merker, S., Walderich, B., Plasterk, R.H.A. (2002) Target-selected inactivation of the zebrafish rag1 gene. Science 297 (July 5): 99–102.
 Wienholds, E., Koudijs, M.J., Van Eeden, F.J.M., Cuppen, E., Plasterk, R.H.A. (2003) The microRNA-producing enzyme Dicer 1 is essential for zebrafish development. Nature Genetics 35: 217–218.
 Sijen, T., Plasterk, R.H.A. (2003) Transposon silencing in the Caenorhabditis elegans germ line by natural RNAi. Nature 426: 310–314.
 Berezikov, E., Guryev, V., van de Belt, J., Wienholds, E., Plasterk, R.H.A., Cuppen, E. (2005) Phylogenetic shadowing and computational identification of human microRNA genes. Cell 120: 21–24.
 Robert, V.J.P., Sijen, T., van Wolfswinkel, J., Plasterk, R.H.A. (2005) Chromatin and RNAi factors protect the C. elegans germline against repetitive sequences. Genes Dev. 19: 782–787.
 Sijen T., Steiner F.A., Thijssen K.L., Plasterk R.H.A. (2007) Secondary siRNAs result from unprimed RNA synthesis and form a distinct class. Science. 2007 Jan 12;315(5809): 244–7.

Popular scientific publications
 Wormen en waarden (1993)
 Techniek van het leven: de betekenis van biotechnologie voor mens en samenleving (2000)
 Leven uit het lab (2002)

Decorations

References

External links

Official
  Prof. Dr. R.H.A. (Ronald) Plasterk Parlement & Politiek

 

1957 births
Living people
Businesspeople from Amsterdam
Businesspeople in the pharmaceutical industry
California Institute of Technology faculty
Critics of creationism
Criticism of intelligent design
Dutch atheism activists
20th-century Dutch biologists
Dutch columnists
Dutch company founders
Dutch critics
Dutch education writers
Dutch essayists
Dutch expatriates in England
Dutch expatriates in the United States
Dutch former Christians
Dutch geneticists
Dutch health and wellness writers
Dutch lobbyists
Dutch magazine editors
Dutch microbiologists
Dutch molecular biologists
Dutch nonprofit directors
Dutch political commentators
Dutch science writers
Human geneticists
Labour Party (Netherlands) politicians
Leiden University alumni
Academic staff of Leiden University
Members of the House of Representatives (Netherlands)
Members of the Royal Netherlands Academy of Arts and Sciences
Ministers of Education of the Netherlands
Ministers of Kingdom Relations of the Netherlands
Ministers of the Interior of the Netherlands
Municipal councillors of Leiden
Officers of the Order of Orange-Nassau
Pharmaceutical company founders
People from Bussum
Scientists from The Hague
Scientists from Amsterdam
Spinoza Prize winners
University of Amsterdam alumni
Academic staff of the University of Amsterdam
Academic staff of Utrecht University
Academic staff of Vrije Universiteit Amsterdam
Writers from Amsterdam
20th-century Dutch educators
20th-century Dutch male writers
20th-century Dutch politicians
20th-century Dutch scientists
21st-century Dutch businesspeople
21st-century Dutch educators
21st-century Dutch male writers
21st-century Dutch politicians
21st-century Dutch scientists